Windermere Lake is the name of three significant lakes in Ontario, Canada.

one in Sudbury District, at 
one in Nipissing District, at 
one in Kenora District, at

See also
List of lakes in Ontario

References
 National Resources Canada

Lakes of Ontario